Pui is a village in Romania.

Pui or PUI may also refer to:
 Pui (society), a mediaeval artistic society
 Pui River, a tributary of the Slănic River in Romania
 Patient under investigation (or person under investigation), a term used during outbreaks of new diseases

See also
 Puy